Leave It to Mrs O'Brien is an Irish television sitcom that aired on RTÉ 2 for two series from 1984 to 1986. Starring Anna Manahan in the title role, it was based on the stories of Angela McFadden.

Plot
Set in a local parochial house in the Liberties area of inner-city Dublin, the show's main character, Mrs O'Brien, is the housekeeper to two Roman Catholic priests. Her main adversary is Sister Gertrude, an archetypal authoritarian dragon, and in the middle are the two priests of the house. The veteran parish priest, Fr. Rooney, is also prone to skullduggery and is in fear of being moved to a new parish by the Bishop. The second priest, Fr. Michael, is a young, trendy and "sensible" curate.

Cast
 Anna Manahan as Mrs O'Brien
 Pat Daly as Fr. Rooney
 Philip O'Sullivan as Fr. "Michael" Lynch
 Blanaid Irvine as Sister Gertrude
 Brendan Caldwell as Pat Dunn
 Chris Curran as Mr Burke
 May Cluskey as Mrs Burke
 Martina Stanley as Maureen
 David Heep as Patrick

Production

Recording
The interior scenes for both series were shot in Studio 1 at the RTÉ Television Centre. While the first series was filmed without a laughter track, the second series was filmed in front of a live studio audience. The quantity of laughter generated was about the same. The second series also saw more on-location filming as well as guest appearances.

Reception
Both series consistently topped the channel's ratings with an audience of over 250,000 per episode; however, it had a less favourable response from the critics. According to the Irish Independent, "One TV critic wanted those responsible 'thrown on the dole and given lousy references'". The network's defense that the series was meant to appeal to undiscriminating viewers, particularly children and the elderly, only invited further criticism.

References

External links
 

1984 Irish television series debuts
1986 Irish television series endings
Irish television sitcoms
RTÉ original programming